Käpfle is a mountain of Baden-Württemberg, Germany to the north of Reutlingen.

Mountains and hills of the Swabian Jura